A list of films produced in Argentina in 1940.

See also 

 Lists of Argentine films

References

External links
 Argentine films of 1940 at the Internet Movie Database

1940
Films
Argentine